Mark Hanna Cardwell (January 7, 1901 – March 20, 1964) was an American football, basketball, and baseball player and coach. He served as the head football coach at West Virginia State College—now known as West Virginia State University—in Institute, West Virginia from 1945 to 1957. Cardwell was also the head basketball coach at West Virginia State for 19 seasons from 1945 until his death in 1964. Cardwellled West Virginia State to Central Intercollegiate Athletic Association (CIAA) championships in football in 1948 and 1951 and in basketball in 1948, 1949, and 1951.

A native of Columbus, Ohio, Cardwell attended East High School, where the played football alongside Chic Harley, who went on to star at Ohio State University. Cardwell played football, basketball and baseball at West Virginia State from 1921 to 1925, when the school was known as West Virginia Collegiate Institute. In football, he played as a  fullback, starting for teams coached by Adolph Hamblin. Cardwell  began coaching career in 1925 at Kelly Miller High School in Clarksburg, West Virginia, remaining there until 1945 when he returned to West Virginia State to succeed Hamblin as head football coach and also coach baseball and track.

Cardwell died of a heat attack, on March 20, 1964, in Morgantown, West Virginia.

Head coaching record

College football

References

1901 births
1964 deaths
West Virginia State Yellow Jackets baseball coaches
West Virginia State Yellow Jackets baseball players
West Virginia State Yellow Jackets football coaches
West Virginia State Yellow Jackets football players
West Virginia State Yellow Jackets men's basketball coaches
West Virginia State Yellow Jackets men's basketball players
College track and field coaches in the United States
High school football coaches in West Virginia
Sportspeople from Clarksburg, West Virginia
Coaches of American football from Ohio
Players of American football from Columbus, Ohio
Baseball coaches from Ohio
Baseball players from Columbus, Ohio
Basketball coaches from Ohio
Basketball players from Columbus, Ohio
African-American coaches of American football
African-American players of American football
African-American baseball coaches
African-American baseball players
African-American basketball coaches
African-American basketball players
20th-century African-American sportspeople